Augusto Paulo César de Sousa Vidal (born 28 May 1970) is a Swedish singer, the lead singer for the band Caesars where he also plays the guitar. He is of Portuguese descent. One of his most famous songs is "Jerk It Out" in the band's 2002 studio album Love for the Streets.

References 

1970 births
Living people
Swedish people of Portuguese descent
21st-century Swedish singers
21st-century Swedish male singers